The Treaty of Fort Confederation was signed on October 17, 1802 between the Choctaw (an American Indian tribe) and the United States Government.

Terms

The preamble begins with.

1. Boundary lines to be re-mark 
2. Title to lands released to the U.S.
3. Alteration of old boundary
4. When the treaty will take effect

Signatories

James Wilkinson, Tuskona Hoopoio, Mingo Pooskoos, Poosha Matthaw, Oak Chummy, Tuskee Maiaby, Latalahomah, Mooklahoosoopoieh, Mingo Hom Astubby, Tuskahoma, Silas Dinsmoor (Agent to the Choctaws), John Pitchlynn, Turner Brashears, Peter H. Marsalis, and John Long.

See also

List of Choctaw Treaties
Treaty of Hopewell
Treaty of Fort Adams
Treaty of Hoe Buckintoopa
Treaty of Mount Dexter
Treaty of Fort St. Stephens
Treaty of Doak's Stand
Treaty of Washington City
Treaty of Dancing Rabbit Creek
List of treaties

Citations

External links
(Treaty with the Choctaw, 1802)

Fort Confederation
1802 treaties
1802 in the United States